Michael Hamill, (born July 19, 1977) is an American high altitude mountaineering guide, alpine climber, mountaineering media personality and alpine author predominately with respect to the Seven Summits.  He was a featured athlete/guide in the Discovery Channel  2008 reality/documentary production, Everest: Beyond the Limits. Michael Hamill is the author of Climbing the Seven Summits," a comprehensive high altitude alpine guide book and multiple magazine articles including Zymurgy magazine’s, "Brewing on Everest."

List of Major Achievements

 Mount Everest (5): May 24, 2008; May 30, 2009; May 23, 2010; May 19, 2011; May 18, 2013 
 Cho Oyu (6): Sept 25, 2002; Sept 27, 2003; Sept 30, 2005; Sept 24, 2008; Oct. 1, 2013 
 Shishapangma: Oct. 4, 2011 
 Seven Summits (5): Completion Dates Dec 28, 2008; July 20, 2009; July 17, 2010; Dec 12, 2011; July 22, 2013 
 Climbed all the Seven Summits in 220 days: Dec 28, 2008 completion date 
 Tied the record for most Adirondack High Peaks climbed in one day (15): completion date Sept 10, 1998 
 44 summits of Mount Rainier (2002 - 2013)

Career
Hamill is the owner of Climbing the Seven Summits (www.climbingthesevensummits.com), an alpine mountaineering media company, and has been a senior mountain guide at International Mountain Guides (Aug 26, 2002 - current) and Alaska Mountaineering School (May 10, 2003 - current) for 13 years.  Hamill has guided 72 expeditions to altitudes exceeding 18,000 vertical feet, including 5 on Mount Everest and 18 in the Himalayas above 8,000m (26,000 ft) (Everest: spring, 2005; spring, 2008; spring, 2009; spring, 2010; spring, 2011; spring, 2012; spring, 2013: Cho Oyu: autumn, 2002; autumn, 2003; autumn, 2004; autumn, 2005; autumn, 2007; autumn, 2008; autumn, 2010; autumn, 2011: Shishapangma: autumn, 2011: Manaslu: autumn, 2012).

See also
List of Mount Everest summiters by number of times to the summit

References

1977 births
Living people
American mountain climbers